The Battle of Medina Ridge was a tank battle fought on the 27 February 1991, during the Gulf War, between the U.S. 1st Armored Division and the 2nd Brigade of the Iraqi Republican Guard Medina Luminous Division outside Basra, Iraq. The U.S. 3rd Brigade, 3rd Infantry Division was also a major contributor, by leading the attack. Iraq's Adnan Motorized Division was also a participant.

The battle, which was waged over approximately two hours, was considered by some sources the largest tank battle of the war. It took place west of Phase Line Kiwi, east of Phase Line Smash, and north of Phase Line Grape. Phase lines are map references occurring every few kilometers used to measure progress of an offensive operation.

History
The 1st Armored Division, commanded by Major General Ron Griffith, consisted of some 3,000 vehicles including 348 M1A1 Abrams tanks. The 1st Armored Division's Cavalry Squadron—1-1 Cavalry—made contact with the Medina Division and informed the Division Commander of the location of the enemy forces. 1st Armored Division's 2nd Brigade (comprising three battalions TF 4-70th Armor, TF 2-70th Armor and TF 1-35th Armor) saw major action in this battle and was commanded by Colonel Montgomery Meigs (a descendant of General Montgomery C. Meigs of Civil War fame)  3rd Brigade, 3rd Infantry Division, commanded by Colonel James Riley replaced 1st Armored Division's 1st Brigade for the duration of the war and was also heavily involved in the battle.

Medina Ridge was one of the few battles during Desert Storm in which American forces encountered significant Iraqi resistance and found it extremely difficult to advance. The Iraqi forces were well-deployed such that they could not be seen by American forces advancing until after they had cleared the top of the ridgeline. This reverse slope position was intended to give the Iraqis protection from the powerful long-range direct fire of the M1 Abrams tanks and the M2 Bradley infantry fighting vehicles.

During the battle the American forces destroyed 186 Iraqi tanks (mostly T-72Ms, Asad Babils and obsolete Type 69s) and 127 armored vehicles. Only four Abrams tanks were hit by direct fire. Evidence suggests that some of them were hit by Iraqi T-72 fire. Ballistics reports have further confirmed this as well as physical evidence such as obvious sabot holes.  Out of the four Abrams that were struck, one was a catastrophic loss, while the other three had been disabled, but could be repaired. Thirty-eight of the Iraqi tanks were destroyed by U.S. Army AH-64 Apaches and U.S. Air Force A-10 Thunderbolt IIs. The 75th Field Artillery Brigade and Battery B, 25th Field Artillery, the division's target acquisition battery, conducted counter-artillery fire missions and destroyed two Medina Field Artillery battalions in the process. The 2nd Battalion, 1st Field Artillery Regiment also eventually participated in these counter-battery missions.

On 25 February, the 3rd Brigade, 3rd Infantry Division conducted a 113 km movement to contact and destroy elements of the 26th Infantry Division resulting in the capture of 299 Prisoners of War. On February 26, the 3rd Brigade was ordered to attack east to gain contact with and destroy the Iraqi Republican Guard Forces Command in zone. The 3rd Brigade began an aggressive and continuous movement to contact which covered 74 km in 12 hours, while fighting multiple engagements throughout the day and night with elements of the 52nd Armored Division, 17th, Adnan, and Tawakalna Divisions. During one engagement with the Tawakalna Division the Brigade destroyed 27 Soviet export model T-72 tanks which had established a hasty defense to cover the Iraqi forces withdrawing from the Kuwaiti Theater of Operation.

As the heaviest Armor Brigade, consisting of the 6th Battalion, 6th Infantry; the 1st Battalion, 35th Armor; the 2nd Battalion, 70th Armor; the 4th Battalion, 70th Armor; the 2nd Battalion, 1st Field Artillery and the 47th Support Battalion (Forward), the 2nd Brigade, 1st Armored Division acted as the lead brigade during combat operations.  On 27 February, the 2nd Brigade was fully engaged with the Medina's 2nd Brigade and, in the largest single engagement of the war, destroyed 61 Iraqi T-72/T-55 tanks, 34 APCs and five SA-13 air defense systems in less than one hour.

On 27 February, the 3rd Brigade, 3rd Infantry Division was ordered to transition to pursuit operations to establish contact with and destroy the RGFC forces in zone. As the Brigade attacked and fought through the Adnan Division, securing a RGFC major logistics base, it captured 465 POWs and made contact with the Medina Armored Division, which was augmented by elements of four other Iraqi divisions. A fierce battle ensued culminating in the destruction of 82 tanks, 31 Armored Personnel Carriers, 11 artillery pieces, 48 trucks, 3 AAA guns and captured 72 POWs for the loss of 2 Bradley Cavalry vehicles, 1 soldier killed, and 30 soldiers wounded.  The American soldier killed was Specialist Clarence A.(“Johnny”) Cash, a scout assigned to 4th Battalion, 66th Armor Regiment, 3rd Infantry Division.  
 
While conducting offensive operations against the Iraqi Republican Guard Forces Command. The 3rd Brigade, 1st Armored Division fought on the Division's right flank as it led the VII Corps main attack against the RGFC. Completing the destruction of the RGFC Brigade, the 3rd Brigade rejoined the Division transitioned to pursuit operations and continued its attack eastward. Executing an aggressive and continuous movement, the 3rd Brigade fought numerous engagements. The Brigade made contact with a tank battalion defending the western flank of a RGFC's major logistics base. The 3rd Brigade, 1st Armored Division raced eastward at a rate of 15 kilometers per hour. In 24 hours of nearly continuous combat, the 3rd Brigade destroyed or captured 547 vehicles, including 102 tanks, 81 armored personnel carriers, 34 artillery pieces, 15 AAA guns and captured hundreds of tons of supplies and 528 POWs. The 3rd Brigade completed this exemplary action without the loss of a single soldier or vehicle and only three soldiers WIA.

1st Armored Division's aviation assets conducted thirty-nine straight hours of continuous combat operations, rotating companies into and out of the battle prior to and after the actions at Medina Ridge. Attack helicopters maintained a steady destructive presence in front of the Division, engaging targets of opportunity and rapidly shifting their focus and combat power as the scenario required. The Brigade's final battle commenced when the Division raced to clear its zone of advance to the Kuwaiti border prior to the impending cease-fire.

Although the Iraqis used a correct defensive tactic by deploying their armor behind the ridge, this was not properly repeated through the rest of the war. In one incident, an Iraqi commander attempted to repeat what had been done at Medina but mistakenly deployed his armor too far from the ridgeline.  This gave the American units the upper hand, as the Abrams tanks specialize in long-distance kills; their Chobham armor is extremely resistant to long-range fire. The American height advantage also reduced the effective range of the Iraqi tanks and presented the Iraqi gunners with a targeting situation for which they were under-trained.

Nevertheless, the Iraqis had fought hard, shooting down an A-10 Thunderbolt II, and two AH-64 Apache helicopters.
Most of the units belonging to the 1st Armored Division and the 3rd Brigade, 3rd Infantry Division were awarded Valorous Unit Award Citations.

In early April 1991, Colonel Montgomery Meigs, the commander of the 2nd Brigade of the 1st Armored Division, paid his respects to his former enemy's Medina Division reporting that, "These guys stayed and fought." The same newspaper articles notes that, "The Americans had more than 100 battle tanks on hand, about the same as the total number of tanks in the Iraqi force. But the Americans had some noteworthy advantages over the Iraqis like attack helicopters and A-10 anti-tanks planes. The Iraqis had no support aircraft."

Task Force 1-37

The 1st Battalion 37th Armor (1st Armored Division) from Rose Barracks, Vilseck, Germany, commanded by LTC Edward L. Dyer, was alerted for deployment to the Persian Gulf on 8 November 1990. 1–37 Armor was the first brigade unit from Vilseck to deploy. 1–37 Armor was attached to the 3rd "Bulldog" Brigade from Warner Barracks in Bamberg, Germany, under their former commander, Colonel Daniel Zannini. A small advance party deployed on 14 December and the main body began departing on 26 December. By 30 December, the battalion had arrived in Saudi Arabia. Vehicles and equipment which had been shipped from ports in Europe began to arrive on 4 January and by 12 January all the equipment had arrived. When hostilities commenced on 15 January 1991, the battalion was in the process of closing the last elements into TAA Thompson. The next month was spent task organizing, training, rehearsing, and preparing for the ground war.

On 24 February, Task Force 1–37 crossed the line of departure as part of VII Corps' attack against Iraqi forces. On 25 February, the battalion attacked and seized the division headquarters of the Iraqi 26th Infantry Division destroying four armored vehicles, eight air defense weapons and captured over forty Enemy Prisoners of War (EPW). After attacking all day on 26 February, TF 1–37, part of 3rd Brigade, 1st Armored Division, made contact with a brigade of the Tawakalna Armored Division of the Republican Guard Forces Command (RGFC) which had established a defensive position to protect the flank of the RGFC and facilitate their escape from Kuwait. After a thirty-minute fire fight, TF 1–37 was ordered to assault the enemy position. The assault, conducted at night, in driving rain, resulted in the destruction of twenty-six T-72 tanks, 47 armored personnel carriers (mostly BMP's) and a handful of other vehicles, as well as the capture of over one hundred EPWs. TF 1–37 suffered the loss of four M1A1 tanks destroyed and six personnel wounded in action. After consolidation and reorganization, the task force continued the attack throughout the night of 26–27 February, reestablishing contact with the RGFC at approximately 0530, 27 February. The task force continued to attack, fighting numerous engagements with elements of multiple Iraqi divisions throughout the 27th and into the morning of the 28 February. At 0800 local time, 28 February, the task force established a hasty defensive position astride the Iraq-Kuwait border. During the last 28 hours of the attack, TF 1–37 destroyed an additional thirty-one tanks, thirty-one BMPs, numerous other APCs, air defense weapons and trucks, and captured over 200 EPWs.

Four days after the cease fire, TF 1–37 moved  further into Kuwait. Two missions were conducted to destroy additional enemy weapons, ammunition and equipment, bury enemy remains, and to recover the four M1A1's which had been destroyed on 26 February.

On 24 March, TF 1–37 moved back into Iraq and established a defensive position in the vicinity of the Rumayilah oil fields. For the next three weeks, task force missions centered on refugee assistance and security operations. On 10 April, TF 1–37 began movement to the Rear Assembly Area (RAA) in the vicinity of King Khalid Military City (KKMC), Saudi Arabia. By 13 April, the task force had closed into the RAA and preparations began for the redeployment of the unit to Germany.

On 16 August 1991 the 1st Brigade, 1st Armored Division was re-designated as the 3d Brigade, 3d Infantry Division.

Unit Citations

2nd Brigade, 1st Armored Division Valorous Unit Award Citation
Headquarters and Headquarters Company, 2nd Brigade, 1st Armored Division distinguished itself by gallantry in action from 26 to 28 February 1991, while conducting offensive operations against the Iraqi Republican Guard Forces Command during operation DESERT STORM. As the heaviest Armor Brigade, consisting of the 6th Battalion, 6th Infantry; the 1st Battalion, 35th Armor; the 2nd Battalion, 70th Armor; the 4th Battalion, 70th Armor; the 2nd Battalion, 1st Field Artillery and the 47th Support Battalion (Forward), the 2nd Brigade led the first Division in the largest tank battle against the Republican Guard Forces Command. Throughout the entire operation, the 2nd Brigade, 1st Armored Division, demonstrated tenacity, esprit de corps, and courageous professionalism. The actions of the 2nd Brigade, 1st Armored Division were in keeping with the highest traditions of military service and reflect great credit upon themselves and the United States Army.

2nd Brigade, 1st Armored Division Units Cited

HHC, 2nd Brigade, 1st Armored Division
6th Battalion, 6th Infantry
1st Battalion, 35th Armor
2nd Battalion, 70th Armor 
2nd Battalion, 1st Field Artillery
47th Support Battalion
4th Battalion, 70th Armor

3rd Brigade, 1st Armored Division Valorous Unit Award Citation
Headquarters and Headquarters 3rd Brigade, 1st Armored division distinguished itself by gallantry in action from 24 to 28 February 1991, while conducting offensive operations against the Iraqi republican Guard Forces Command (RGFC) during Operation DESERT STORM. The Brigade fought on the Division's right flank as it led the VII Corps main attack against the RGFC. Completing the destruction of the RGFC Brigade, the 3rd Brigade rejoined the Division transitioned to pursuit operations and continued its attack eastward. Executing an aggressive and continuous movement, the 3rd Brigade fought numerous engagements. The Brigade made contact with a tank battalion defending the western flank of a RGFC's major logistics base. Attacking with all three Battalions on line, the enemy vaporized in front of the Brigade, ten armored vehicles destroyed in the first minute of the battle. The Brigade's relentless attack continued throughout the day and into the night as it raced eastward at a rate of 15 kilometers per hour. In 24 hours of nearly continuous combat, the Brigade destroyed or captured 547 vehicles, including 102 tanks, 81 armored personnel carriers, 34 artillery pieces, 15 AAA guns and captured hundreds of tons of supplies and 528 EPWs. The Brigade completed this exemplary action without the loss of a single soldier or vehicle and only three WIAs. Through their demonstrated courage, tenacity, esprit de corps and professionalism, Headquarters and Headquarters Company, 3rd Brigade, 1st Armored Division actions reflect great credit upon themselves and the United States Army.

3rd Brigade, 1st Armored Division Units Cited

HHC, 3d Brigade, 1st Armored Division
1st Battalion, 37th Armor 
3d Battalion, 35th Armor
7th Battalion, 6th Infantry  
3d Battalion, 1st Field Artillery
125th Support Battalion

3rd Brigade, 3rd Infantry Division Valorous Unit Award Citation
For exceptionally meritorious service as the Advanced Guard Brigade of the 1st Armored Division during offensive operations against the Iraqi Republican Guard Forces Command (RGFC) during Operation Desert Storm from 24 to 28 February 1991. As an attached Brigade consisting of 1/7th Infantry, 4/7th Infantry, 4/66th Armor, 1/1st Cavalry, 2/41st Field Artillery, 16th Engineer Battalion, and 26th Forward Support Battalion, the 3rd Brigade led the 1st Armored Division and VII Corps main attack against the RGFC. On 25 February, the Brigade conducted a 113 km movement to contact to destroy elements of the 26th Infantry Division resulting in the capture of 299 Enemy Prisoners of War (EPWs). On February 26, the Brigade was ordered to attack east to gain contact with and destroy the RGFC in zone. The 3rd Brigade began an aggressive and continuous movement to contact which covered 74 km in 12 hours, while fighting multiple engagements throughout the day and night with elements of the 52nd, 17th, Adnan, and Tawakalna Divisions. During one engagement with the Tawakalna Division the Brigade destroyed 27 Soviet T-72s which had established a hasty defense to cover the Iraqi forces withdrawing from the Kuwaiti Theater of Operation. On 27 February, the 3rd Brigade was ordered to transition to pursuit operations to establish contact with and destroy the RGFC forces in zone. As the Brigade attacked and fought through the Adnan Division, securing a RGFC major logistics base, it captured 465 EPWs and made contact with the Medina Armored Division, which was augmented by elements of four other Iraqi divisions. A fierce battle ensued culminating in the destruction of 82 tanks, 31 Armored Personnel Carriers, 11 artillery pieces, 48 trucks, 3 AAA guns and captured 72 EPWs with the loss of only 2 Bradley Cavalry vehicles, 30 WIAs and 1 KIA. Through their demonstrated tenacity, Esprit de Corps, and courageous professionalism, the units of the 3rd Phantom Brigade have brought great credit upon themselves, the 3rd Infantry Division and the United States Army.

3rd Brigade, 3rd Infantry Division Units Cited

Headquarters and Headquarters Company, 3rd Brigade, 3rd Infantry Division
1st Squadron, 1st Cavalry
1st Battalion, 7th Infantry
2nd Battalion, 41st Field Artillery
2nd Platoon, 218th Military Police Company
2nd Platoon, 501 Military Police Company 
3rd Platoon, Battery C, 6th Battalion, 3rd Air Defense Artillery
4th Battalion, 7th Infantry (Minus Company D)
4th Battalion, 66th Armor
26th Forward Support Battalion
Battery A, 6th Battalion, 3rd Air Defense Artillery
Company A, 1st Battalion, 35th Armor
Company B, 16th Engineer Battalion
Company B, 141st Signal Battalion
Company B, 54th Engineer Battalion
Company D, 16th Engineer Battalion
Civil Affairs Team, 401st Civil Affairs Detachment
Counter Intelligence, Prisoner of War Team, 501st Military Intelligence Battalion
Ground Surveillance Reconnaissance, 501st Military Intelligence Battalion
Nuclear, Biological and Chemical Decontamination Platoon, 69th Chemical Battalion
Nuclear, Biological and Chemical Reconnaissance Platoon, 69th Chemical Battalion
HHC, 16th Engineer Battalion
Long Range Surveillance Detachment, 501st Military Intelligence Battalion

Aviation Brigade, 1st Armored Division Valorous Unit Award Citation
Headquarters and Headquarters Company, Aviation Brigade, 1st Armored Division distinguished itself by gallantry in action against an armed enemy during Operation DESERT STORM from 23 to 28 February 1991. The Brigade conducted combat operations to ascertain enemy dispositions along the Division's zone of advance. The Brigade's aircraft conducted continuous flight operations as the Division's movement to contact accelerated into Iraq. Time and again the attack helicopters were employed against Iraqi armored elements forward of the Division's ground forces. The Brigade conducted thirty-nine straight hours of continuous combat operations, rotating companies into and out of the battle. Because of their integration into the Division's close fight, the destruction of the Medina and Adnan Divisions was assured. Attack helicopters maintained a steady destructive presence in front of the Division, engaging targets of opportunity and rapidly shifting their focus and combat power as the scenario required. The Brigade's final battle commenced when the Division raced to clear its zone of advance to the Kuwaiti border prior to the impending cease-fire. The Brigade completed its combat operations without suffering the loss of any aircraft, vehicles or personnel. Through their expertise, tenacity, and courage, Headquarters and Headquarters Company, Aviation Brigade, 1st Armored Division actions reflect great credit upon themselves and the United States Army.

Aviation Brigade, 1st Armored Division Units Cited

HHC, Aviation Brigade, 1st Armored Division
2nd Battalion, 1st Aviation
3nd Battalion, 1st Aviation
Company I, 1st Aviation

Historical Significance
The Battle of Medina Ridge is recognized as the largest tank battle of the Gulf War by some sources. Other sources put it second behind the Battle of Norfolk.

References

Further reading
 

Carhart, Tom (1994). Iron Soldiers: How America's 1st Armored Division Crushed Iraq's Elite Republican Guard. New York: Random House..

External links
History of 2nd Brigade, 1st Armored Division "The Iron Brigade" at GlobalSecurity.org
https://www.youtube.com/watch?v=73yDXCSdW8k

1991 in Iraq
Medina Ridge
Medina Ridge 1991
Medina Ridge
Medina Ridge
Medina Ridge
February 1991 events in Asia